Arthur James Barlow (23 October 1904 – 21 August 1951) was an Australian rules footballer who played for the South Melbourne Football Club and Footscray Football Club in the Victorian Football League (VFL).

Notes

External links 
		

1904 births
1951 deaths
Australian rules footballers from Melbourne
Sydney Swans players
Western Bulldogs players
Prahran Football Club players
People from Port Melbourne